The Miroslaw Romanowski Medal is awarded annually by the Royal Society of Canada "for significant contributions to the resolution of scientific aspects of environmental problems or for important improvements to the quality of an ecosystem in all aspects - terrestrial, atmospheric and aqueous - brought about by scientific means".

Established in 1994, the medal is named in honour of the metrologist Mirosław Romanowski.

Recipients
Source: Royal Society of Canada

See also

 List of environmental awards 
 List of prizes named after people

References

Environmental awards
Canadian science and technology awards
Awards established in 1994
Royal Society of Canada
1994 establishments in Canada